In telecommunications, a data forwarder is a device that 
(a) receives data from one data link and retransmits data representing the same information, using proper format and link protocols, to another data link.
and 
(b) may forward data between 
(a) links that are identical, i.e., TADIL B to TADIL B, 
(b) links that are similar, i.e., TADIL A to TADIL B, or 
(c) links that are dissimilar, i.e., TADIL A to TADIL J.

References

Telecommunications equipment